Lorrin Alanson Cooke (April 6, 1831 – August 12, 1902) was an American politician and the 57th governor of Connecticut from 1897 to 1899.

Biography
Cooke was born in New Marlborough, Massachusetts, the Son of Levi Cooke and Amelia (Todd) Cooke. He was educated at Norfolk Academy in Connecticut, For several years after high school, he taught school in the Norfolk area in the winter and worked on his father's farm in the summer. By 1850, when Lorrin was nineteen, the Cooke family had moved to Colebrook. As a young farmer, he wanted to learn about and use the latest developments in agriculture. He joined the local agricultural society, was elected president, and his leadership began to develop.

Career
Cooke worked with railroad officials to route a train through the remote Colebrook area, increasing sales as produce was freighted to the big city, and the town prospered. His election to the Connecticut General Assembly as the representative from the town of Colebrook in 1856, when he was only 25 years old, gave him his first experiences in state politics. He was married in 1858 to Matilda Eunice Webster, and married Josephine Ward in 1870. He had no children with his first wife and three with his second; Edward, Ward, and Edna. Only Edna lived to adulthood.

Cooke served as postmaster for Riverton, Connecticut, from 1877 to 1881, as state senator for the 18th District in the Connecticut State Senate from 1883 to 1885, and was President Pro Tempore of the Senate from 1884 to 1885.

In 1885 Cooke became the 62nd lieutenant governor of Connecticut. He held that position from 1885 to 1887. He was a delegate to the Republican National Convention from Connecticut in 1892. He served again (as the 66th lieutenant governor) from 1895 to 1897.

Cooke was elected the governor of Connecticut in 1896, and served from January 6, 1897, to January 4, 1899. During his term, he was successful in his attempts in leaving a financially sound state treasury, even with increased governmental expenditures, which resulted from the outbreak of the Spanish–American War. After leaving the office, Cooke remained active in civic events.

Death
Cooke died in Winsted, Connecticut, on August 12, 1902. He is interred at Center Cemetery, Colebrook, Connecticut.

References

External links

 Sobel, Robert and John Raimo. Biographical Directory of the Governors of the United States, 1789-1978. Greenwood Press, 1988. 
The Political Graveyard
National Governors Association
Connecticut State Library

1831 births
1902 deaths
People from Berkshire County, Massachusetts
Republican Party members of the Connecticut House of Representatives
Republican Party Connecticut state senators
Lieutenant Governors of Connecticut
Republican Party governors of Connecticut
Presidents pro tempore of the Connecticut Senate
American Congregationalists
People from Colebrook, Connecticut
19th-century American politicians